The Italian general election of 1994 took place on 27–28 March 1994.

In 1993–1994 the Tangentopoli scandals led to the disappearance of the main government parties, including Christian Democracy (DC) and the Italian Socialist Party (PSI). The DC successor, the Italian People's Party (PPI), was not able to retain the votes of its predecessor, which were largely absorbed by Liga Veneta–Lega Nord and Forza Italia, the new party launched by entrepreneur Silvio Berlusconi. In a highly fragmented party system, Forza Italia came first with 23.6% and Liga Veneta second with 21.6%.

Results

Chamber of Deputies

|- bgcolor="#E9E9E9"
!style="background-color:#E9E9E9" align=left rowspan=2 valign=bottom|Coalition
!colspan="3" align="center" valign=top|Single-seat constituencies
!colspan="5" align="center" valign=top|Proportional system
!colspan="1" align="center" valign=top|Total
|-
|- bgcolor="#E9E9E9"
|align="center" valign=top|votes
|align="center" valign=top|votes (%)
|align="center" valign=top|seats
|align="center" valign=top|Party
|align="center" valign=top|votes
|align="center" valign=top|votes (%)
|align="center" valign=top|seats
|align="center" valign=top|tot.
|align="center" valign=top|seats

|-
|rowspan="2" align="left" valign=top|Pole of Freedoms
|rowspan="2" align="right" valign=top|?
|rowspan="2" align="right" valign=top|?
|rowspan="2" align="right" valign=top|36

|rowspan="1" align="left"|Forza Italia
|align="right"|767,121
|align="right"|23.6
|align="right"|2

|rowspan="2" align="right" valign=top|4
|rowspan="2" align="right" valign=top|40

|-

|rowspan="1" align="left"|Lega Nord
|align="right"|701,615
|align="right"|21.6
|align="right"|2

|-
|rowspan="5" align="left" valign=top|Alliance of Progressives
|rowspan="5" align="right" valign=top|?
|rowspan="5" align="right" valign=top|?
|rowspan="5" align="right" valign=top|1

|rowspan="1" align="left"|Democratic Party of the Left
|align="right"|394,699
|align="right"|12.2
|align="right"|2

|rowspan="5" align="right" valign=top|3
|rowspan="5" align="right" valign=top|4

|-

|rowspan="1" align="left"|Communist Refoundation Party
|align="right"|143,998
|align="right"|4.4
|align="right"|1

|-

|rowspan="1" align="left"|Federation of the Greens
|align="right"|124,107
|align="right"|3.8
|align="right"|-

|-

|rowspan="1" align="left"|Italian Socialist Party
|align="right"|54,090
|align="right"|1.7
|align="right"|-

|-

|rowspan="1" align="left"|Democratic Alliance
|align="right"|25,380
|align="right"|0.8
|align="right"|-

|-
|rowspan="2" align="left" valign=top|Pact for Italy
|rowspan="2" align="right" valign=top|?
|rowspan="2" align="right" valign=top|?
|rowspan="2" align="right" valign=top|-

|rowspan="1" align="left"|Italian People's Party
|align="right"|505,692
|align="right"|15.6
|align="right"|3

|rowspan="2" align="right" valign=top|4
|rowspan="2" align="right" valign=top|4

|-

|rowspan="1" align="left"|Segni Pact
|align="right"|152,808
|align="right"|4.7
|align="right"|1

|-
|rowspan="1" align="left"|National Alliance
|rowspan="1" align="right"|?
|rowspan="1" align="right"|?
|rowspan="1" align="right"|-

|rowspan="1" align="left"|National Alliance
|align="right"|251,031
|align="right"|7.7
|align="right"|1

|rowspan="1" align="right"|-
|rowspan="1" align="right"|1

|-
|rowspan="1" align="left"|Lega Autonomia Veneta
|rowspan="1" align="right"|?
|rowspan="1" align="right"|?
|rowspan="1" align="right"|-

|rowspan="1" align="left"|Lega Autonomia Veneta
|align="right"|103,976
|align="right"|3.2
|align="right"|-

|rowspan="1" align="right"|-
|rowspan="1" align="right"|-

|-
|rowspan="1" align="left"|Others
|rowspan="1" align="right"|?
|rowspan="1" align="right"|?
|rowspan="1" align="right"|-

|rowspan="1" align="left"|others
|align="right"|19,473
|align="right"|0.6
|align="right"|-

|rowspan="1" align="right"|-
|rowspan="1" align="right"|-

|-
|- bgcolor="#E9E9E9"
!rowspan="1" align="left" valign="top"|Total coalitions
!rowspan="1" align="right" valign="top"|?
!rowspan="1" align="right" valign="top"|100.0
!rowspan="1" align="right" valign="top"|37
!rowspan="1" align="left" valign="top"|Total parties
!rowspan="1" align="right" valign="top"|3.243.990
!rowspan="1" align="right" valign="top"|100.0
!rowspan="1" align="right" valign="top"|13
!rowspan="1" align="right" valign="top"|13
!rowspan="1" align="right" valign="top"|50
|}
Source: Regional Council of Veneto

Provincial breakdown
* = Including Patto Segni.Source: Regional Council of Veneto

Senate

|- bgcolor="#E9E9E9"
!style="background-color:#E9E9E9" align=left rowspan=2 valign=bottom|Coalition
!colspan="3" align="center" valign=top|Single-seat constituencies
!colspan="1" align="center" valign=top|PR
!colspan="1" align="center" valign=top|Total
|-
|- bgcolor="#E9E9E9"
|align="center" valign=top|votes
|align="center" valign=top|votes (%)
|align="center" valign=top|seats
|align="center" valign=top|seats
|align="center" valign=top|seats
|-
|rowspan="1" align="left" valign=top|Pole of Freedoms
|rowspan="1" align="right" valign=top|1,129,315
|rowspan="1" align="right" valign=top|40.7
|rowspan="1" align="right" valign=top|17
|rowspan="1" align="right" valign=top|-
|rowspan="1" align="right" valign=top|17
|-
|rowspan="1" align="left" valign=top|Alliance of Progressives
|rowspan="1" align="right" valign=top|598,790
|rowspan="1" align="right" valign=top|21.6
|rowspan="1" align="right" valign=top|-
|rowspan="1" align="right" valign=top|3
|rowspan="1" align="right" valign=top|3
|-
|rowspan="1" align="left"|Pact for Italy
|rowspan="1" align="right" valign=top|545,220
|rowspan="1" align="right" valign=top|19.7
|rowspan="1" align="right" valign=top|-
|rowspan="1" align="right" valign=top|2
|rowspan="1" align="right" valign=top|2
|-
|rowspan="1" align="left"|National Alliance
|rowspan="1" align="right" valign=top|221,263
|rowspan="1" align="right" valign=top|8.0
|rowspan="1" align="right" valign=top|-
|rowspan="1" align="right" valign=top|1
|rowspan="1" align="right" valign=top|1
|-
|rowspan="1" align="left"|Lega Autonomia Veneta
|rowspan="1" align="right" valign=top|165,370
|rowspan="1" align="right" valign=top|6.0
|rowspan="1" align="right" valign=top|-
|rowspan="1" align="right" valign=top|-
|rowspan="1" align="right" valign=top|-
|-
|rowspan="1" align="left"|Veneto Autonomous Region Movement
|rowspan="1" align="right" valign=top|64,149
|rowspan="1" align="right" valign=top|2.3
|rowspan="1" align="right" valign=top|-
|rowspan="1" align="right" valign=top|-
|rowspan="1" align="right" valign=top|-
|-
|rowspan="1" align="left"|Others
|rowspan="1" align="right" valign=top|49,770
|rowspan="1" align="right" valign=top|1.8
|rowspan="1" align="right" valign=top|-
|rowspan="1" align="right" valign=top|-
|rowspan="1" align="right" valign=top|-
|-
|- bgcolor="#E9E9E9"
!rowspan="1" align="left" valign="top"|Total coalitions
!rowspan="1" align="right" valign="top"|2,773,877
!rowspan="1" align="right" valign="top"|100.0
!rowspan="1" align="right" valign="top"|17
!rowspan="1" align="right" valign="top"|6
!rowspan="1" align="right" valign="top"|23
|}
 Source: Regional Council of Veneto

Elections in Veneto
General, Veneto